V. gouldii may refer to:
 Varanus gouldii, the sand goanna, a reptile found throughout Australia
 Vertigo gouldii, the variable vertigo, an air-breathing land snail species

See also
 Gouldii (disambiguation)